In military terms, 88th Division or 88th Infantry Division may refer to:

Infantry divisions:
88th Division (People's Republic of China) 
88th Infantry Division (France) 
88th Infantry Division (German Empire) 
88th Infantry Division (Wehrmacht)
88th Division (Imperial Japanese Army)
88th Division (National Revolutionary Army)
88th Rifle Division (Soviet Union), an infantry division of the Soviet Union
88th Motor Rifle Division, Soviet Union
88th Infantry Division (United States)

See also 
 88th Regiment (disambiguation)